Sadeqabad (also Romanized as Şādeqābād) is a village in Ashiyan Rural District, in the Central District of Lenjan County, Isfahan Province, Iran. At the 2006 census, its population was 69, in 20 families.

References 

Populated places in Lenjan County